Xinghua Township is a township of Huma County in  the east of Da Hinggan Ling Prefecture in far northern Heilongjiang province, China, located about  northwest of the county seat. , it has six villages under its administration.

See also 
 List of township-level divisions of Heilongjiang

References 

Township-level divisions of Heilongjiang